Ziilch is a free community driven website that provides Australians a way to give away items they no longer want to other people who may need them. It's free to list items on Ziilch and it's free to take them.

History 
Ziilch was founded in 2010 by Michelle Power. The idea was conceived in order to combat hard-rubbish dumping and to reduce the number of household items being sent to landfill. The website officially launched in July 2011.

Process 
The site can be browsed by anyone, however signing up is required if the user wants to request or give away items.
A person takes a picture of the item they wish to give away and then assigns it a category and gives it a description. The item is then posted on the site. Other members can then register their interest for the item by clicking the request button. The person who listed the item is notified both via email and via notification on the site of these requests and then they choose at their discretion who they wish to give the item to.
Once this decision is made, the two parties communicate via email to organise collection of the item. Some items cannot be listed.

Media 
Ziilch has been featured regularly in the media since its launch, including a featured story on Channel 9's A Current Affair in 2012 and 2013 as well as a featured story on Channel 7's Today Tonight in 2012. They have also been featured on news.com.au, StartupSmart and in the Herald Sun.

References

 https://www.heraldsun.com.au/leader/inner-south/peninsula-business-ziilch-gives-people-chance-to-recycle-rubbish/news-story/86b287fcc7c997ac60d99cb63ee49e8a
 https://www.pressreader.com/australia/money-magazine-australia/20180906/282303910993654
 http://homehub.homeloans.com.au/freecycle-stuff/
 https://www.news.com.au/finance/money/free-living-is-a-modern-way-to-save-as-aussies-ditch-consumerism/news-story/3256553f695487dff387ccf9a2406a7d
 https://www.choice.com.au/shopping/online-shopping/selling-online/articles/selling-and-trading-your-things-online

Online companies of Australia
Internet properties established in 2010
2010 establishments in Australia